Israel Luna is an American filmmaker, best known for his movies Ticked-Off Trannies with Knives, Kicking Zombie Ass for Jesus, and Fright Flick. He currently resides in San Francisco, California.

Early life
Luna first became interested in film at the age of five while watching a movie at a dual-screen drive-in theater near his tiny hometown of Wellington, Texas, located in the Texas Panhandle. During the family outing he was supposed to be watching the movie Superman, but he says his eyes were "glued to the next screen over" which was playing The Exorcist. He was fascinated at how images on a screen could make people scared, laugh or cry. He dreamed of making movies ever since.

Career
As a young adult, he moved to Dallas and began pursuing a film-making career. He produced a couple of segments of a gay-themed soap opera called Boobs, Boys and High Heels for the local public access television network, DCTV. After achieving some notoriety with the soap opera and gaining a great deal of hands-on experience, he embarked on a career as an indie filmmaker. 

In 2000 he co-founded La Luna Entertainment with his business partner John Maguire in Dallas, Texas. He has since written and directed several feature-length movies and has been involved with many other made-for-TV, stage and internet projects. His movie Fright Flick played at numerous venues on the 2008/2009 festival circuit in the United States and made its international screening debut in Amsterdam. The 2010 film Ticked-Off Trannies with Knives has been his biggest success to date, although it was denounced as "grotesque" and "exploitive" by the Gay and Lesbian Alliance Against Defamation (GLAAD).

La Luna announced plans to film another low-budget comedy intended to act as a companion piece to La Luna's film Ticked-Off Trannies with Knives to be titled Kicking Zombie Ass for Jesus.  Willam Belli, Krystal Summers, and Richard D. Curtin were announced as slated to star in this zombie apocalypse spoof in which the only survivors were gay people and church people. The film was intended to begin shooting in late 2012, and La Luna began a crowdfunding campaign through Kicktraq, but failed to meet his intended goal. According to Belli, the film begins shooting in October 2013.

Recognition
Recognition of his projects includes: 
 Winner, Young Filmmakers Award at the Austin Film Festival, for his work on REEL KiDS
 Audience Award for Best Feature, for The Deadbeat Club at Dallas' Deep Ellum Film Festival
 A nomination for Best Feature for R U Invited? at Dallas' OUT TAKES Film Festival
 "Most Memorable of the Fest", for Fright Flick at the B-Movie Film Festival in Syracuse, New York

Filmography
 Not It! (2002)
 Is Anybody There? (2002)
 Almost Time (2002)
 The Deadbeat Club (2004)
 I Know Who You Are (2005)
 R U Invited? (2006)
 Drop Me Off (2010)
 Ticked-Off Trannies with Knives (2010)
 Reunited (2011)
 Fright Flick (2011)
 The Ouija Experiment (2011), a remake of Is Anybody There?
 The Ouija Experiment 2 (2014)
 Dead Don't Die in Dallas (2019)

References

External links
 
 La Luna Entertainment website

People from Dallas
American male screenwriters
American film directors
American editors
Film producers from California
Writers from San Francisco
Living people
People from Wellington, Texas
Screenwriters from California
Screenwriters from Texas
Film producers from Texas
Year of birth missing (living people)